Yalda is a feminine given name originating in Persian named after Yaldā Night, the Iranian New Year festival.

People
Yalda Hakim, Afghan-Australian journalist and TV presenter
Yalda Moaiery, Iranian photojournalist
Yalda Samadi, Iranian musician

Places
Yalda, Syria

Media
Yalda, a Night for Forgiveness, Iranian film